Little Orphan Annie is a 1932 American pre-Code comedy film directed by John S. Robertson, and written by Wanda Tuchock and Tom McNamara. It is based on the comic strip Little Orphan Annie by Harold Gray. The film stars Mitzi Green, Buster Phelps, May Robson, Matt Moore, and Edgar Kennedy. The film was released on November 4, 1932, by RKO Pictures.

Plot
Oliver "Daddy" Warbucks is going away to find gold. He must leave Annie and Sandy, and promises that when he gets back, they will be rich. On the way home, Sandy finds a little boy named Mickey crying behind a fence. Mickey is upset because his grandmother died, and he is being forced to go to an orphanage.

Cast
Mitzi Green as Annie
Buster Phelps as Mickey
May Robson as Mrs. Stewart
Matt Moore as Dr. Griffiths
Edgar Kennedy as Daddy Warbucks
Kate Drain Lawson as Mrs. Bergen
Sidney Bracey as Butler

References

External links
 

1932 films
1932 comedy films
American black-and-white films
American comedy films
Films based on American comics
Films based on comic strips
Films directed by John S. Robertson
Films with screenplays by Wanda Tuchock
Live-action films based on comics
RKO Pictures films
Films about orphans
Films based on Little Orphan Annie
1930s English-language films
1930s American films
English-language comedy films